Homecoming Live, previously known as Pow Wow, is a signature homecoming event at Florida State University in Tallahassee, Florida. It is typically held at Florida State's Donald L. Tucker Civic Center before the Florida State Seminoles football teams' annual homecoming game, usually on a Friday night.

External links
FSU Homecoming Live official site

References

Culture of Tallahassee, Florida
Florida State University
Tourist attractions in Tallahassee, Florida